An electoral redistribution in British Columbia was undertaken by the BC Electoral Boundaries Commission beginning in 2014 and was formalized by the passage of Bill 42, the 2015 Electoral Districts Act, during the 40th British Columbia Parliament. The act came into effect on November 17, 2015. The redistribution added two seats to the previous total, increasing the number of MLAs in the province from 85 to 87. The electoral boundaries came into effect for the 2017 election. The next redistribution is required to occur following the 2020 British Columbia general election.

Changes

No change (36)
Burnaby-Deer Lake
Burnaby-Edmonds
Cowichan Valley
Delta North
Delta South
Kamloops-North Thompson
Kelowna-Lake Country
Kelowna-Mission
Kootenay West
Maple Ridge-Mission
Maple Ridge-Pitt Meadows
Nechako Lakes
Nelson-Creston
North Coast
North Island
Peace River North
Peace River South
Penticton
Port Coquitlam
Powell River-Sunshine Coast
Saanich North and the Islands
Skeena
Shuswap
Stikine
Vancouver-Fairview
Vancouver-Fraserview
Vancouver-Hastings
Vancouver-Kensington
Vancouver-Kingsway
Vancouver-Langara
Vancouver-Mount Pleasant
Vancouver-Point Grey
Vancouver-Quilchena
Vernon-Monashee
Victoria-Swan Lake
West Vancouver-Capilano

Adjusted (39)
Abbotsford-Mission
Abbotsford South
Abbotsford West
Boundary-Similkameen
Burnaby-Lougheed
Burnaby North
Cariboo-Chilcotin
Cariboo North
Chilliwack
Columbia River-Revelstoke
Coquitlam-Burke Mountain
Coquitlam-Maillardville
Fraser-Nicola
Kamloops-South Thompson
Kootenay East
Langley
Nanaimo
Nanaimo-North Cowichan
New Westminster
North Vancouver-Lonsdale
North Vancouver-Seymour
Oak Bay-Gordon Head
Parksville-Qualicum
Port Moody-Coquitlam
Prince George-Mackenzie
Prince George-Valemount
Richmond-Steveston
Saanich South
Surrey-Cloverdale
Surrey-Fleetwood
Surrey-Green Timbers
Surrey-Newton
Surrey-Panorama
Surrey-Whalley
Surrey-White Rock
Vancouver-False Creek
Vancouver-West End
Victoria-Beacon Hill
West Vancouver-Sea to Sky

Minor adjustment with name change (1)
Kelowna West (was "Westside-Kelowna")

Replaced (9)
(primary successor riding is shown)

Alberni-Pacific Rim → Mid Island-Pacific Rim
Chilliwack-Hope → Chilliwack-Kent
Comox Valley → Courtenay-Comox
Esquimalt-Royal Roads → Esquimalt-Metchosin
Fort Langley-Aldergrove → Langley East
Juan de Fuca → Langford-Juan de Fuca
Richmond Centre → Richmond North Centre
Richmond East → Richmond-Queensborough
Surrey-Tynehead → Surrey-Guildford

New ridings (2)

Richmond South Centre
Surrey South

See also
 British Columbia electoral redistribution, 2008

References

British Columbia, 2015
Electoral redistribution, 2015
2015 in Canadian politics
Electoral redistribution